Sar Tang-e Pivareh (also Romanized as Sar Tang-e Pīvāreh; also known as Sar Tang) is a village in Ludab Rural District, Ludab District, Boyer-Ahmad County, Kohgiluyeh and Boyer-Ahmad Province, Iran. At the 2006 census, its population was 72, in 11 families.

References 

Populated places in Boyer-Ahmad County